Omega Township is a township in O'Brien County, Iowa, USA.

History
Omega Township was founded in 1881, and named after the letter of the Greek alphabet.

References

Townships in O'Brien County, Iowa
Townships in Iowa